Gerhard VI (c. 1367–1404) was the Count of Holstein-Rendsburg from 1382, and Duke of Schleswig as of 1386.

Gerhard VI was born around 1367, the son of Count Henry II from the Rendsburg line of the House of Schauenburg and Ingeborg of Mecklenburg. After the death, in 1381 or 1384, of his father, who had ruled jointly with Gerhard's uncle Nicholas (Claus), Gerhard and his younger brother Albert II entered into the joint government for their late father. On 15 September 1386 King Olav III of Denmark enfeoffed him with the Duchy of Schleswig, after his uncle Nicholas had resigned from that function.

In 1390 Gerhard and his brother and uncle inherited Holstein-Kiel, including the merged Plön, whose line had been extinct in 1350. After their uncle Nicholas had died in 1397 the brothers divided their possessions, the elder keeping Schleswig and Holstein-Rendsburg, and Albert II receiving Holstein-Segeberg as secundogeniture. In 1403 Gerhard regained Segeberg by way of reversion upon Albert's death in action against Ditmarsh, thus ruling almost the whole of Holstein except of Holstein-Pinneberg. The Duchy of Schleswig and the County of Holstein-Rendsburg were then under one ruler. He fell in the Battle on the Hamme on 4 August 1404 during another attempt to subjugate Ditmarsh.

Family
In 1391 Gerhard married Catherine Elisabeth of Brunswick-Lüneburg, daughter of Magnus II of Brunswick-Lüneburg. They had the following children:
Henry IV (b. 1397; d. 1427), Duke of Schleswig, Count of Holstein
Ingeborg (b. 1398; d. 1465), abbess of Vadstena
Helvig (b. ca. 1400; d. ca. 1436), married Dietrich of Oldenburg, mother of Christian I, King of Denmark.
Adolphus VIII (b. 1401; d. 1459), Duke of Schleswig, Count of Holstein
Gerhard VII (b. 1404; d. 1433), Duke of Schleswig, Count of Holstein

See also
List of rulers of Schleswig-Holstein

Sources

Counts of Holstein
Dukes of Schleswig
House of Schauenburg
1367 births
1404 deaths